Turnera hermannioides is plant species found in Brazil.

References

Medicinal plants
Flora of Brazil
hermannioides